The Nera is a  long river that flows almost entirely in Umbria, Italy. It is the largest tributary to the Tiber, its sources are in the Monti Sibillini, east of Foligno. It flows southward past Terni and Narni. It joins the Tiber near Orte. Its largest tributaries are the Velino and the Corno.

See also
Roman shipyard of Stifone (Narni)

References

Rivers of Italy
Rivers of the Province of Macerata
Rivers of the Province of Perugia
Rivers of the Province of Terni
Rivers of the Province of Viterbo